Have a Little Faith is a 2011 Hallmark Hall of Fame made-for-television drama film. The film is based on Detroit Free Press columnist Mitch Albom’s best-selling nonfiction book of the same name.

Plot
Writer Mitch Albom is asked to write the eulogy for his childhood rabbi but is reluctant to do so.

Cast
 Laurence Fishburne as Henry Covington
 Martin Landau as Rabbi Albert L. Lewis
 Bradley Whitford as Mitch Albom

Filming
The film was made in and around the state of Michigan.

Broadcast
The film debuted on ABC on November 27, 2011, as the first Hallmark Hall of Fame film broadcast since CBS cancelled the series earlier in 2011.  It was the first Hallmark Hall of Fame film broadcast on ABC since 1995.

Ratings
On its November 27, 2011 broadcast, the film earned a 1.1 rating among adults aged 18 to 49, the lowest rating among all programs on the four major networks that night. The total number of viewers was estimated at 6.5 million, compared to 13.5 million for the Hallmark Hall of Fame presentation of November Christmas on the weekend after Thanksgiving in 2010.

References

External links
 
 Have a Little Faith on slanting-n 

2011 television films
2011 films
2011 biographical drama films
Films based on non-fiction books
Biographical television films
American drama television films
Hallmark Hall of Fame episodes
Films shot in Michigan
Films based on works by Mitch Albom
Films directed by Jon Avnet
Films scored by Edward Shearmur
2010s American films